Carlos and Anne Recker House, also known as the Recker-Aley-Ajamie House, is a historic home located at Indianapolis, Marion County, Indiana.  It was built in 1908, and is a -story, Bungalow / American Craftsman style frame dwelling.  It has a steeply pitched side-gable roof with dormers.  The house was built to plans prepared by Gustav Stickley through his Craftsman Home Builder's Club.

It was added to the National Register of Historic Places in 1996.

References

Houses on the National Register of Historic Places in Indiana
Bungalow architecture in Indiana
Houses completed in 1908
Houses in Indianapolis
National Register of Historic Places in Indianapolis
1908 establishments in Indiana